Zoey Francis Chaya Thompson Deutch (born November 10, 1994) is an American actress and producer. She is daughter of director Howard Deutch and actress-director Lea Thompson. She gained recognition for her roles in the film Everybody Wants Some!!, the Netflix comedy series The Politician, and the romantic comedy film Set It Up.

Deutch began her career with roles on the Disney Channel comedy series The Suite Life on Deck (2010–2011) and The CW crime drama series Ringer (2011–2012). Following her credited film debut in the gothic romance film Beautiful Creatures (2013), she starred in the fantasy horror film Vampire Academy (2014), for which she received a Teen Choice Award nomination.

Deutch gained further prominence for her roles in the acclaimed films Everybody Wants Some!! (2016), Before I Fall (2017), Flower (2017), Rebel in the Rye (2017), and The Outfit (2022), the latter of which earned her a British Independent Film Award for Best Supporting Actress nomination. In 2017, her mother directed her and her sister Madelyn in the comedy-drama film The Year of Spectacular Men, which Deutch also co-produced. She went on to star in Why Him? (2016), Set It Up (2018), Zombieland: Double Tap (2019), Buffaloed (2019), and Not Okay (2022).

Early life
Deutch was born on November 10, 1994, in Los Angeles, California, to actress Lea Thompson and director Howard Deutch. She has one sister, Madelyn Deutch, who is also an actress. Other close relatives of hers include her maternal grandmother, musician Barbara Barry Thompson, paternal grandfather, music executive Murray Deutch, and great-uncle actor Robert Walden. Deutch's father, from New York, is of Jewish heritage, whereas her mother, from Minnesota, is of partial Irish ancestry. Deutch is Jewish and had a bat mitzvah.

She started taking acting classes at the age of five. Deutch studied at Oakwood School, Los Angeles County High School for the Arts and at the Young Actors Space. She majored in theater at L.A. County High School for the Arts.

Career

2010–2013: Early work
Deutch began her career in 2010, at the age of 15, with a role on the Disney Channel original series The Suite Life on Deck as Maya, Zack Martin's love interest. From 2011 to 2012, she played recurring role of Juliet Martin in The CW thriller drama Ringer. She debuted on the big screen in Mayor Cupcake (2011) alongside her mother and sister. Deutch booked a small scene in The Amazing Spider-Man but director Marc Webb cut the scene, although it is included on the DVD.

Her big screen breakthrough came in the supporting role of Emily Asher, alongside Emma Thompson, Thomas Mann and Alden Ehrenreich in the 2013 fantasy-romance-drama Beautiful Creatures based on a well-known young adult novel of the same name written by authors Kami Garcia and Margaret Stohl and the first book in the Caster Chronicles series. Deutch also appeared on NCIS, Criminal Minds: Suspect Behavior, ABC Family's Switched at Birth and in Marc Cherry's television pilot Hallelujah.

2014–2016: Breakthrough
Deutch starred as Rosemarie Hathaway in Vampire Academy (2014), based on the first book of best-selling young adult six book series written by Richelle Mead. The film marked her first appearance as a lead. Jordan Hoffman of the New York Daily News termed her performance in the film as breakout lead performance. In January 2014, it was announced that she would star as lead opposite Tyson Ritter in Randall Miller's Midnight Rider, a biopic of Gregg Allman. Deutch then joined the teen coming-of-age comedy Good Kids, which was released on October 21, 2016, by Vertical Entertainment. She also landed the lead role in Julie Plec's and Sue Kramer's rom-com Cover Girl and starred in the official music video of the song "Opium" by The New Division with Avan Jogia.

In 2016, Deutch played Beverly in Richard Linklater's Everybody Wants Some!!, which premiered at SXSW Film Festival. Deutch was essentially the only female lead in the film, paired with freshman ballplayer Jake Bradford played by Blake Jenner. She starred alongside Robert De Niro and Zac Efron in Dirty Grandpa, as love interest to Efron's character and in Why Him? alongside James Franco, Bryan Cranston and Megan Mullally. She played a Stanford student, daughter to Bryan Cranston and Megan Mullally's characters, who falls in love with a billionaire, Laird, played by James Franco. Deutch's next role was in the crime drama Vincent-N-Roxxy, alongside Emory Cohen, Emile Hirsch and Zoë Kravitz which premiered at the 2016 Tribeca Film Festival.

2017–present: Further recognition

Deutch starred as Samantha "Sam" Kingston in Before I Fall, an adaptation of Lauren Oliver's best-selling young adult novel of the same name, also starring Jennifer Beals and Kian Lawley. Andrea Mandell of USA Today described Before I Fall as a milestone in Deutch's rising career. The scripts of Good Kids, Dirty Grandpa and Before I Fall were on the 2011 Black List. A second film featuring Deutch premiered at Sundance Film Festival in 2017, Danny Strong's Rebel in the Rye. The biopic of author J.D. Salinger saw Deutch as Oona O'Neill opposite Nicholas Hoult, Kevin Spacey, and Laura Dern.

Deutch starred in Flower directed by Max Winkler, with a script written by Alex McAulay. Flower was added to the 2012 Black List and premiered at the 2017 Tribeca Film Festival. Aubrey Page of Collider described her performance as an "electric lead performance" and David Ehrlich of IndieWire thought the film "confirms that Zoey Deutch is a genuine star in the making." Frank Scheck of The Hollywood Reporter concluded "Flower is redeemed only by Zoey Deutch's magnetic performance, which would be star-making if in the service of a better vehicle."

Deutch appeared in her mother Lea Thompson's directorial debut The Year Of Spectacular Men as Sabrina, with Avan Jogia, her sister Madelyn, Cameron Monaghan and Nicholas Braun. She also shares the production credit for the film. The film had its world premiere in June 2017 in Los Angeles Film Festival 2017 and was screened at various film festivals before theatrical release. Scott Menzel of We Live Entertainment described her role as Sabrina in this film as "without question her finest performance to date." Along with these, in the same year, was seen opposite Ed Sheeran in the official music video of his song "Perfect" from the album ÷. The video which was released on November 9, 2017, has garnered over 3 billion views and 16 million likes, as of November 2021. Also in 2017, she appeared in James Franco's The Disaster Artist, based on the book by Greg Sestero and Tom Bissell, which tells the behind-the-scenes story behind cult film The Room.

Deutch starred opposite her Everybody Wants Some costar Glen Powell, in Netflix's 2018 romantic comedy Set It Up. The story follows two overworked assistants who try to get their horrible bosses out of their hair by setting them up together. She also landed a role in the drama-comedy The Professor alongside Johnny Depp. In May 2019, the makers of Netflix rom-com Set It Up announced that Deutch will be reuniting with Glen Powell for another rom-com tentatively titled Most Dangerous Game. In July 2018, it was announced that Deutch would be starring in Ryan Murphy's new web television comedy series on Netflix, The Politician alongside Ben Platt and Gwyneth Paltrow, which was released on Netflix on September 27, 2019. She appeared in the drama film Buffaloed directed by Tanya Wexler in 2019.

Deutch starred as Madison in Zombieland: Double Tap alongside Emma Stone and Jesse Eisenberg, the sequel to zombie comedy Zombieland, which was released October 11, 2019. She received positive reviews for her performance, and Deutch was nominated at the 2020 Fangoria Chainsaw Awards for Best Supporting Actress. In 2020, Deutch starred in the Quibi television series adaptation Home Movie: The Princess Bride, to raise money for World Central Kitchen. In 2021, she appeared in the music video "Anyone", a song by Canadian singer Justin Bieber; for the first song. She also joined Hound as the lead character "Callie" as well as producer. In February 2021, it was announced that Deutch will star in Graham Moore's directorial debut The Outfit alongside Mark Rylance and Dylan O'Brien. In June 2021, she was cast in Quinn Shephard's Not Okay, a satire feature film which will be released on Hulu. She lent her voice for the character Lily in adult animated comedy series Fairfax premiering on Amazon Prime Video in October 2021. In November 2021, it was announced that she will play the lead and be executive producer of Something From Tiffany's, an Amazon Original film co-produced by Reese Witherspoon and Hello Sunshine, based on the Melissa Hill novel.

Other work
Deutch along with Gugu Mbatha-Raw, Rodrigo Santoro and Vince Vaughn performed a live reading of selected scenes from five winning scripts of 2017 at the 2017 Academy Nicholl Fellowships in Screenwriting Awards Presentation & Live Read. She also joined as a presenter at 2018 Film Independent Spirit Awards. She again took the stage as a host for welcoming the founder of non-profit, non-governmental organization Vital Voices, Hillary Clinton at Global Leadership Awards 2018. She joined as one of the speakers in first ever "Embrace Ambition Summit" held at Lincoln Center in New York. She is one of the invitees to the Academy 2018 membership.

Activism
Deutch supports Planned Parenthood and was part of its rally with pro-choice advocates and leaders celebrating the 45th anniversary of Roe v. Wade at Sacramento, California. She has performed for the benefit of Alzheimer's Association and "What a pair!" Org with her mother Lea Thompson and sister Madelyn Deutch. With her family, she has worked for more than a decade with Corazón de Vida, which supports orphanages in Baja California, Mexico. She participated in the 2017 Women's March and returned in 2018. She is also a part of the Embrace Ambition campaign of the Tory Burch Foundation. She was one of the celebrity ambassadors for the seventh annual "Shop for Success" charity designer shopping event that supports the efforts of Dress For Success. She has also shown her support toward anti-sexual harassment movement Time's Up. She has been a part of several fundraising campaigns for charity and in support of various causes.

In the media

Deutch has been the cover girl to Justine magazine's February 2013 issue, Miabella magazine's April 2013 issue, Afterglow magazine's December 2013 issue, Bello magazine's March 2014 edition, Flaunt magazine's June 2015 issue, the February 2016 issue of Cosmopolitan U.S., spring 2016 edition of Rogue magazine. She appeared on the cover of September 2016 issue of Harper by Harper's Bazaar and performed as a guest editor.

She modeled for March 2013 issue of Interview, Allure's December 2016 issue and has done feature shoots for February 2014 issues of Seventeen and InStyle magazine, December 2015 issue of Nylon, January 2016 and April 2017 issues of W Magazine, March 2017 issue of Vanity Fair Italia, April 2017 issue of Vogue Russia and Vogue Turkey, May 2017 issue of Vanity Fair Spain, July 2017 issue of Marie Claire Indonesia, summer 2017 issue of Wonderland magazine and summer campaign shoot for Tory Burch LLC.

She was on the cover of the April 2017 issue of C California Style Magazine and also among Marie Claire's Fresh Faces 2017 and one of the cover stars of its May 2017 edition. She was on the cover of annual Women Of Hollywood portfolio of The Edit magazine in May, 2017., Spring/Summer 2017 issue 07 of Tidal Magazine and on the February 2018 edition of New York Post Alexa. She was the May 2018 cover star of Ocean Drive Magazine, Capitol File Magazine, and Los Angeles Confidential magazine. In 2020, she featured in first ever worldwide video and image campaign, #MeAndMyPeekaboo by Italian luxury fashion house Fendi.

She is frequently included in best dressed lists for her various appearances and also seen in front rows of Milan Fashion Week, Paris Fashion Week, Diane von Furstenberg, Cushnie et Ochs, DKNY, New York Fashion Week,
Fendi's Haute couture show. In 2013, Glamour included her among their list of "Hollywood's Next Big Things". Deutch was among the Yahoo! Breakout Stars for the year 2014. In 2014, Vanity Fair listed her among their "Hollywood's Next Wave Lineup". In the same year, Variety also included her in their list of "'It' Girls (And Boys): Young Hollywood's Rising Stars". The Hollywood Reporter listed her among their "Next Gen Talent 2016: Hollywood's Rising Stars 35 and Under" list.

Harper's Bazaar described her as "quickly becoming Young Hollywood's most valuable player". In 2017, British GQ described her as "Hollywood's hottest newcomer" and Grazia Italy described her as the symbol of the "new generation of actresses-activists". In a 2018 Indie Wire critics survey, she was listed among "The Best American Actors Under 30".
She was included in 'Forbes 30 under 30' class of 2020 in the field of Hollywood and entertainment.

Filmography

Film

Television

Music videos

Awards and nominations

References

External links

 
 

1994 births
Living people
21st-century American actresses
Actresses from Los Angeles
American child actresses
American film actresses
American people of Irish descent
American television actresses
Jewish American actresses
21st-century American Jews